St Margaret's Church is an ancient Anglican parish church situated on St Margaret's Way in Leicester, England. It is a Grade I listed building.

History
Parts of the transept date from c. 1200, and parts of the aisles from the late 13th century. Most of the church was rebuilt in Perpendicular style c. 1444, under William Alnwick, the Bishop of Lincoln. It contains a ring of 14 bells including a flat sixth. There was a Victorian restoration by George Gilbert Scott in 1860, and another in 1881 by George Edmund Street.

The church contains stained glass by Thomas Willement dating from the 1840s, and William Wailes of 1864.

Tombs
The alabaster effigy of John Penny dates from 1520, although his original tomb was replaced in 1846. He was the abbot of Leicester Abbey from 1496 to 1509, and subsequently Bishop of Carlisle.
 

The churchyard contains the 1765 tomb of Andrew Rollo, 5th Lord Rollo. The Doric, Grade II* listed structure is faced with slate relief sculptures.

Organ
The organ dates from 1773 but is now much enlarged. A specification of the organ can be found on the National Pipe Organ Register.

Organists
1785–1845 Ann Valentine
1845–1897 George Augustus Löhr

References

14th-century church buildings in England
Churches completed in 1444
Saint Margaret
Saint Margaret
Grade I listed churches in Leicestershire